Cai Han (1647–1686), was a Chinese landscape painter. She was the concubine of the painter Mao Xiang and, with his other concubine Jin Yue, she was commissioned by him with the task of producing paintings as gifts to his guests; they became known as "The Two Painters of the Mao Family".

Names

Cai Han's courtesy name on attaining adulthood was Nüluo. She also went by her art name of Yuanyu.

Life

Cai was the daughter of a member of staff in the house of Mao Xiang in Rugao. Sometime during the reign of the Shunzhi Emperor, an artist from Suzhou called Wu Ruixian sought refuge with Mao. Wu taught Cai to paint and write poetry. Around 1661, Cai became one of Mao's concubines, along with Jin Yue. The two women collaborated on many compositions, earning renown as 'the two artists of the Mao family'.

Art

Cai Han was particularly well-known for her landscape paintings. The Guochao Hua Zheng Xulü described Cai as, 'particularly good at painting landscapes, flowers, animals, and birds,' and, 'adept at imitations.' She painted many pieces together with her fellow concubine Jin Yue 金鈅, including Auspicious noon, now held in the Nanjing Museum. In her depictions of people, Xie Li identifies the influence of Tang Yin on Cai's technique. In 2001, one of Cai's works painted in 1680, titled Shuihui yuan tu, appeared at an auction house in Shanghai, where it was sold for 40,000 RMB to an unknown buyer.

References

Notes

Works cited

External links
 

1647 births
1686 deaths
17th-century Chinese painters
Qing dynasty landscape painters
17th-century Chinese women artists